Ariane Burri (born 14 April 2000) is a Swiss snowboarder. She made her Olympic debut representing Switzerland at the 2022 Winter Olympics.

Career 
She represented Switzerland at the 2016 Winter Youth Olympics and competed in both girls' slopestyle and girls' halfpipe events.

She competed at the 2022 Winter Olympics and took part in both the women's slopestyle and women's big air events.

References 

2000 births
Living people
Swiss female snowboarders
Snowboarders at the 2016 Winter Youth Olympics
Snowboarders at the 2022 Winter Olympics
Olympic snowboarders of Switzerland
Sportspeople from Bern
21st-century Swiss women